Labeo ricnorhynchus is a species of freshwater fish belonging to the genus Labeo. It is endemic to India.

References

ricnorhynchus
Fish described in 1839